Daniel Edward "Ned" Sawyer (June 20, 1882 – July 5, 1937) was an American golfer who competed in the 1904 Summer Olympics. In 1904 Sawyer was part of the American team that won the gold medal. He finished second in this competition. In the individual competition, he finished ninth in the qualification and was eliminated in the quarter-finals of the match play.

Sawyer won the 1906 Western Amateur after finishing runner-up in 1904 and finished runner-up in the 1905 U.S. Amateur.

References

External links
 Daniel Sawyer's profile at Sports Reference.com
 Daniel Sawyer's profile at databaseOlympics

American male golfers
Amateur golfers
Golfers at the 1904 Summer Olympics
Olympic gold medalists for the United States in golf
Medalists at the 1904 Summer Olympics
1882 births
1937 deaths